Jesselton Twin Towers is a 56-storey, 192.15-meter-tall twin skyscraper in Kota Kinabalu, Sabah, Malaysia. Tower B was completed in 26 Dec 2022 and Tower A was completed in 15 Feb 2023. It surpassed the 34-storey The Peak Condominium in Bintulu, Sarawak as the tallest building in Borneo Island.

Facilities
The Jesselton Twin Towers is planned to be the first buildings in Borneo to be equipped with high-speed elevators, made by Mitsubishi.

The recreation deck will be located on the tenth floor with facilities such as a gym room, a  swimming pool, jacuzzi, function room, sauna and steam room, and children playground. There will also be sky facilities on the 54th and 55th level, which consists of skydeck, skygarden, multipurpose hall, lounge and library.

The skydeck is due to be the tallest skydeck in Borneo, overlooking Likas Bay and Mount Kinabalu which is the tallest mountain in Borneo and Malaysia.

Progress Timeline
As of February 2022, tower A had reached the 47th level and tower B had reached the 54th level. 

As of August 2022, tower A had reached the 54th level and tower B had officially topped out.

See also
List of tallest buildings in Malaysia
List of tallest buildings in Kota Kinabalu
Kinabalu Tower
Tun Mustapha Tower
Jesselton Residences

References

Buildings and structures in Kota Kinabalu
Buildings and structures completed in 2023
Twin towers